"Phone Down" is a 2016 song by Lost Kings featuring Emily Warren.

Phone Down may also refer to:

 "Phone Down" (Stefflon Don and Lil Baby song), 2019
 "Phone Down", a song by Armin van Buuren and Garibay featuring Justin Stein from the 2019 album Balance

See also
 
 Pick Up the Phone (disambiguation)